Thomas William Stobbs Jr. (May 28, 1896 – November 14, 1968) was a professional American football player for the National Football League's Detroit Tigers.  He attended high school in Wheeling, West Virginia player college football at Washington & Jefferson College.

Following his retirement from playing, he attempted to become head coach of the W&J football team.

His son, Chuck Stobbs, played professional baseball.

Head coaching record

Football

References

External links
 
 

1896 births
1968 deaths
Basketball coaches from West Virginia
Detroit Tigers (NFL) players
Washington & Jefferson Presidents football players
Wittenberg Tigers football coaches
Wittenberg Tigers men's basketball coaches
Sportspeople from Norfolk, Virginia
Sportspeople from Wheeling, West Virginia
Players of American football from Norfolk, Virginia
Players of American football from West Virginia